Northern Marmara and Değirmenköy (Silivri) Depleted Gas Reservoir are underground natural gas storages inside depleted gas fields in Istanbul Province, northwestern Turkey. Combined, it is the country's first underground natural gas storage facility.

One of the storage facilities is situated inside a depleted gas field undersea in northern Marmara Sea and the other is in neighboring Değirmenköy, a town in Silivri district of Istanbul Province. Both sites were suitable due to their proximity to Istanbul and to the gas pipeline of BOTAŞ.

Northern Marmara Gas Field

To determine the size of the natural gas reserve, which is the first undersea natural gas reserve in Turkey, three offshore boreholes in 1995 and two more were drilled in 1996. Natural gas production started in September 1997 at the five gas wells. Gas was pumped from an offshore platform by a -long undersea pipeline to the plant at the coast for processing.

Değirmenköy Natural Gas Field
The field was discovered in 1994, and the production started in 1995 from nine wells, seven of which were directional. Gas processing facility was built by a consortium of German Lurgi AG and Turkish Fernas Construction Ltd.

Depleted gas reservoirs
The storage facilities of Northern Marmara and Değirmenköy were projected by the Turkish Petroleum Corporation (TPAO) in 1996. The depleted gas reservoirs went into service in July 2007. The Northern Marmara Reservoir is connected to the main processing plant of BOTAŞ by a -long pipeline and the Değirmenköy Reservoir by a -long pipeline.

Currently, the Northern Marmara and Değirmenköy (Silivri) Depleted Gas Reservoir is the only underground natural gas storage facility in Turkey. It is operated by the TPAO.

Capacity expansion
The entire natural gas storage project is planned in three phases. The second phase involves the capacity expansion for the Değirmenköy facility, and the third phase for the Northern Marmara facility. It is planned that the total storage capacity will be , the daily injection capacity  and the daily withdrawal capacity  after completion of the third phase.

See also

 Lake Tuz Natural Gas Storage
 Marmara Ereğlisi LNG Storage Facility
 Egegaz Aliağa LNG Storage Facility
 Botaş Dörtyol LNG Storage Facility

References

Natural gas storage
Energy infrastructure in Turkey
Natural gas in Turkey
2007 establishments in Turkey
Energy infrastructure completed in 2007
Buildings and structures in Istanbul Province
Silivri
Botaş
21st-century architecture in Turkey